Nikola Tanhofer (25 December 1926 – 24 November 1998) was a Croatian film director, screenwriter and cinematographer. His first film as director, It Was Not in Vain was entered into the 7th Berlin International Film Festival.

His most accomplished film, H-8 (1958), won him a Golden Arena award at the Pula Film Festival. After two less successful films, the psychological war drama Osma vrata (1959) and Sreća dolazi u 9 (1961), the first Yugoslavian feature film with fantastical elements, he directed two somewhat more successful ones, Dvostruki obruč (1963) and Svanuće (1964). After directing Bablje ljeto (1970), he devoted himself to teaching at the Department for Film and Television Cinematography, which he founded in 1969 at the former Academy For Theater, Film And Television in Zagreb. He wrote Filmska fotografija (Film Photography) in 1981.

Filmography
 Plavi 9 (1950)
 It Was Not in Vain (1957)
 H-8 (1958)
 Klempo (1958)
 Osma vrata (1959)
 Sreća dolazi u 9 (1961)
 Dvostruki obruč (1963)
 Svanuće (1964)
 Bablje ljeto (1970)

Notes

 Yugoslavian Film Encyclopedia, Yugoslavian Lexicographic Institute "Miroslav Krleža", 1986–1990

References

Further reading
 A Superior Film Decathlete

External links

1926 births
1998 deaths
Croatian film directors
Croatian cinematographers
Croatian screenwriters
Vladimir Nazor Award winners
Golden Arena for Best Director winners
Film people from Zagreb
Yugoslav film directors
Burials at Mirogoj Cemetery
20th-century screenwriters